Thomas Hawley (died 22 August 1557) was a long-serving officer of arms at the College of Arms in London.

Thomas Hawley may also refer to:

Thomas E. Hawley, acting United States Under Secretary of the Army, 2015
Thomas Porter Hawley (1830–1907), United States federal judge
Thomas Hawley (MP) for Lincolnshire (UK Parliament constituency)
Thomas Hawley House, a historic Colonial American wooden post-and-beam saltbox farm house built in 1755 in Monroe, Connecticut
Thomas Hawley, namesake of Hawley, Minnesota
Thomas Hawley (priest), clergyman in the Church of Ireland